The Dal Fiachrach Suighe were an Irish lineage claiming descent from Fiachra Suighe (also spelled Fiacha Suidhe), the youngest of six sons of Fedlimid Rechtmar. His oldest brother was the legendary High King Conn Cétchathach. They are the ancestors of the Déisi Muman and the Déisi Tuisceart (later known as the Dál gCais).

Fiachra's great-great-great-great grandsons, the four sons of Art Corb, were expelled from Tara, a story told in The Expulsion of the Déisi. One group, led by Eochaid Allmhuir, settled in Dyfed c. 270, while the second group eventually settled among the Déisi of south Munster. These events have been tied to Irish pirate raids all over the west coast of Roman Britain in the 4th and 5th centuries and to the foundation of the Irish kingdoms of Dyfed, Brecon and Cornwall around 400.

Citations

References

 "The Déisi and Dyfed", T. Ó Cathasigh, Eigse, vol. XX, 1984, p. 1-33.
 "The Vita tripartita of St. Patrick", Eoin MacNeill, Eriu 11, 1932, p. 1-41.

Miller, Molly, 1977/8 'Date-Guessing and Dyfed', Studia Celtica 12/13, pp. 33–61.

 "The Dual Nature of Irish Colonization of Dyfed in the Dark Ages", Bruce Coplestone-Crow, Studia Celtica, vols. 16/17, 1981/82, pages 1–24.
 "The Irish Settlements in Wales", Myles Dillon, Celtica, Vol. XII, 1977, pages 1–11.

Irish families